The Mercedes-Benz CLE is an upcoming model that will be launched in 2024 and replace the C- and E-Class coupes.

A performance variant, the Mercedes-AMG CLE 53 and CLE 63, is also planned.

Overview
The CLE Coupe is set to replace both the C-Class and E-Class as part of Mercedes' drive to streamline its model range.

It has a rounded, single-bar grille with a honeycomb mesh insert and is accompanied by C-Class-style headlights and sporty air intakes. The rear includes LED taillights and an angular boot with an integrated spoiler. There is also a curved bumper that does not have exhaust cutouts.

Mercedes hasn't provided much detail about the CLE, and even its name remains unconfirmed. However, the model is expected to be based on the C-Class and feature a similar interior with a 12.3-inch digital instrument cluster as well as an 11.9-inch infotainment system.

References

CLE-Class
Coupés